Who's the Caboose? is a 1997 comedy film co-written and directed by Sam Seder and starring himself and Sarah Silverman in their film debut. The supporting cast includes comedians David Cross, Andy Dick, Laura Silverman, Laura Kightlinger, Chuck Sklar, H. Jon Benjamin, Andy Kindler, Mark Cohen, Kathy Griffin, Leo Allen, Marc Maron and Todd Barry, most of whom had not appeared in a theatrical movie prior to this one. The screenplay by Sam Seder and Charles Fisher depicts a romantically involved couple (Silverman and Seder) who travel separately from Manhattan to Los Angeles to attempt to secure a television series role during "pilot season", a set period of months when producers cast new shows. The New York City sequence at the beginning of the film features footage shot at the Luna Lounge in the Lower East Side, which has since been razed.

The film was followed by a television miniseries sequel entitled Pilot Season, again written by Sam Seder and Charles Fisher, directed by Seder, and starring Sarah Silverman as Susan Underman, which was broadcast over six episodes in 2004 on the now-defunct Trio cable network.

Cast

Sarah Silverman	 as	Susan Underman
Sam Seder	 as	Max
Eric Slovin	 as	Congratulator #1
Leo Allen	 as	Congratulator #2
Beth Tapper	 as	Susan's Friend
Alison Solomon	 as	Susan's Friend #2
Todd Barry	 as	Foosball Player
Marc Maron	 as	Comedian
Ross Brockley	 as	Social Dilettante
Andy Dick	 as	Jason Reemer
Laura Silverman	 as	"At Every Audition" Girl
Laura Kightlinger	 as	Gwenn
Wendy Smith	 as	Casting Director #1
David Earl Waterman	 as	Earl
Esau McKnight	 as	Sensai
Mark Cohen	 as	Alternative Comedian
John Barnett	 as	John Devlin
Jeff Rosenthal	 as	Client
Eliza Coyle	 as	Client
Lauren Dombrowski	 as	Jason's Assistant
Kathy Griffin	 as	Katty
H. Jon Benjamin	 as	Ken Fold
David Cross	 as	Jaded Guy
Joel Avalos	 as	Taco Stand Owner
Jana Marie Hupp	 as	Papillion
Melissa Samuels	 as	Vendela
Clif Gordon	 as	Asst. Casting Director
Leslie Danon	 as	Girl in Bar
Susan Nichols	 as	Girl in Bar #2
Alison Noble	 as	Develin's Date
Karri Turner	 as	Wendi
Lili Barsha	 as	Max's Fan
Chuck Sklar	 as	Desperate Writer
Mike Reynolds	 as	Susan's Landlord
Cary Prusa	 as	Temporary Host
Alison Teicher	 as	Casting Director #2
Wilandrea Blair	 as	V.P. of Comedy
Ned Goldreyer	 as	Asst. Studio Head
Andy Kindler	 as	Sitcom Writer
Traci Odom	 as	Studio Head
Jack Plotnick	 as	V.P. of Casting
John Ennis	 as	Irish Songster
Mary Lynn Rajskub	 as	Cheeseball
Alan Frazier	 as	Party Bartender
Alan Gelfant	 as	CAA Agent
Kenneth Stephens	 as	Network Executive
Alex Ferrer	 as	Homeless Man
Derek Edwards  as Congratulator #5 (uncredited)

References

External links
 Who's the Caboose? at Hulu
 Who's the Caboose? in the IMDb
 Who's the Caboose? at Cinelogue
 
 Who's the Caboose? in the Chicago Tribune
 Who's the Caboose? in The New York Times
 Who's the Caboose? at Cinedigm Entertainment

1997 films
American comedy films
1997 comedy films
1990s English-language films
1990s American films